Qubais Reed Ghazala (born 1953), an American author, photographer, composer, musician and experimental instrument builder, is recognized as the "father of circuit bending," having discovered the technique in 1966, pioneered it, named it, and taught it ever since. 

Ghazala, who is from Cincinnati, Ohio, has built experimental instruments and/or consulted for many prominent musicians including Tom Waits, Peter Gabriel, King Crimson, and the Rolling Stones.
Ghazala's work has been covered globally in the press including the New York Times'''s declaration of circuit-bending as part of the fine arts movement (April 8, 2004, Technology Section, Matthew Mirapaul), and can be found being taught world-wide.

Ghazala's work is held in various galleries internationally including the permanent collections of New York City's Museum of Modern Art, the Guggenheim and the Whitney Museum of American Art as part of the Fusion Arts compendium.

Ghazala's influence upon creative electronic design is global, having originated the planet's first "grassroots electronic art movement" (while Ghazala has noted that he was not the lone, or first, experimenter in the field, it should be recognized that his contemporaries’ work, regardless of date, did not spawn an international and specific art movement replete with original terminology, processes and an ever-increasing fellowship).

Ghazala's practice with chance art (the root of circuit-bending) also involves studies in dye migration materials  and Japanese suminagashi , as well as liquid, gel and smoke chambers, mobiles and pyrotechnics.

History
Ghazala accidentally discovered the technique of circuit bending in the 1960s when he left a toy amplifier in his desk and heard it start to emit sounds comparable to those produced by expensive synthesizers of the day. The amplifier's casing had been opened, exposing its inner circuitry and allowing it to short circuit when placed against the metal desk. It is this chance aspect of bending that serves as the foundation of circuit-bending.

Since discovering circuit bending, Ghazala has built countless instruments. These mostly consist of electronic toys modified with the circuit bending technique and customized until they barely resemble the original product. He has produced numerous audio compositions with these instruments which have been featured on many albums. He has also written a series of works relating to and teaching the circuit bending process, including his book, published by Wiley & Sons, titled Circuit-Bending: Build Your Own Alien Instruments''.

Ghazala coined the term "immediate canvas" in his work with circuit bending, which is the concept that through circuit bending the hurdles of electronic design are avoided. Anyone can step up to an open circuit and create, without needing to know electronic theory or daunting equations. Another term coined by Ghazala is BEAsape which means BioElectronicAudiosapien. When body contacts are used, the body of the performer is used as a variable resistor – there is a fusion between man and machine into one purpose which Ghazala says is something new zoologically and musically.

Bibliography

Discography

 A Watch in the Sea, Sound Theater (Cassette) 1982
 Sound Theater One: Music and Event, Sound Theater (Cassette) 1982
 Mind Over Matter, Sound Theater (Cassette) 1983
 Sound Theater Two: Visions, Sound Theater (Cassette) 1983
 Bring Your Room, Sound Theater (Cassette) 1985
 The Dreams that Insects Dream, Sound Theater (Cassette) 1985
 Requiem for a Radio, Sound Theater (Cassette) 1985
 The Sound Theater Radio Special Sound Theater (Cassette) 1985
 Suite for a Radio and Turntable: Outdoor Operations, Sound Theater (Cassette) 1985
 Posters in the Underground, Sound Theater and Sound of Pig (Cassette) 1986
 Vinegar versus Cats, Sound Theater (Cassette) 1986
 Go Mad Xmas, Sound Theater (Cassette) 1987
 Natural Science, Sound Theater (Cassette) 1987
 Spzz Tapes, Sound Theater (Cassette) 1987
 Artifacts, Sound Theater (Cassette) 1988
 Behind the Emotional Mask, Sound Theater (Cassette) 1989
 Cassette Mythos: Feast of Hearing, CM (Cassette) 1989
 Schematic, Pointless Music (cassette) 199?
 Three Rings on the Ground, Pointless Music (Cassette) 199?
 Clones and Friends, EJAZ (Cassette) 199?
 Assemblage 1990, Realization Records (Cassette) 1990
 Anti White Bastards, PBK-USA (Cassette) 1991
 Cassette Mythos: Audio Alchemy, What's Next? Records (Cassette, CD) 1991
 Electricity, Pointless Music (Cassette) 1992
 From the pages of EMI, No. 7, Experimental Musical Instruments (Cassette) 1992
 4 X 4, Ladd/Frith (CD) 1993
 Burning Suns of Shadow Worlds, Ladd/Frith (Cassette) 1993
 Drum, Spilling Audio (Cassette) 1993
 Gawk: Lore of the Ox Owl, Sacrifice (Cassette) 1993
 A Darker Solvent/EnTerres, Edicion, Spain (LP) 1993
 Postal Sound Surgery, Pointless Music (Cassette) 1993
 There is a Secret Garden, Sound Theater (Cassette) 1993
 From the pages of EMI, No. 8, Experimental Musical Instruments (Cassette) 1993
 Blacklight Braille: Sleep Not Yet, Vetco (CD) 1994
 Gawk: Marc Sloan, Reed Ghazala, Askance (Cassette) 1994
 No Dub, Spilling Audio (Cassette) 1994
 Objekt 5.5, Ladd/Frith (Cassette) 1994
 Objekt 5, Ladd/Frith (CD) 1994
 Objekt 666 (double cassette), Ladd/Frith (Cassette) 1994
 Redrum, Spilling Audio (Cassette) 1994
 Smells like 7, Spilling Audio (Cassette) 1994
 State of the Union, MR (CD) 1994
 The Little Fiddles in the Grass, Epitapes (Cassette) 1994
 From the pages of EMI, No. 9, Experimental Musical Instruments (Cassette) 1994
 Blacklight Braille: Songs for the Longhaired Son, Vetco (CD) 1995
 Better Things are Electric. M&M 1995
 Gawk-Gawd, Askance (CD) 1995
 Requiem for a Radio, Realization Records (CD) 1995
 Threnody to the New Victims of Hiroshima. Realization Records (CD) 1995
 From the pages of EMI, No. 10, Experimental Musical Instruments (Cassette) 199?
 Gravikords Whirlies and Pyrophones, Ellipsis Arts (CD/Book) 1996
 Blacklight Braille: Songs from Moonlight Snow (CD) 1996
 State of the Union, Atavistic (CD) 1996
 From the pages of EMI, No.11, Experimental Musical Instruments (Cassette) 1996
 Blacklight Braille: Into the world of the Gods, Vetco (CD) 1997
 The ReR Quarterly; v.4 #2; ReR (CD) 1997
 From the pages of EMI, No. 12, Experimental Musical Instruments (Cassette) 1997
 Blacklight Braille: Black Moon Selection, Vetco (CD) 1998
 Mad Art River; Askance (CD) 1998
 HOPE; Audio Research Editions (CD) 1998
 Blacklight Braille: Dietles Tavern; Vetco; (CD) 1999.
 Blacklight Braille: Sailing Away; Razzle 1999
 Blacklight Braille: Old Bones and Sacred Stones; Razzle; (CD) 1999
 Blacklight Braille; The castle of the Northern Crown; Razzle; (CD) 1999

Notes

External links
 Ghazala's home page
 An interview with Ghazala
 Short Vice documentary on Reed Ghazala, the Father of Circuit Bending

American electronic musicians
Living people
1953 births
American musical instrument makers
People from Cincinnati